Widner Saint-Cyr (born November 18, 1990) is a Haitian football player who plays as a midfielder.

Career

College and amateur
Saint-Cyr played five years of college soccer at the University of Maryland, including a redshirted year in 2010.

Professional career
Saint-Cyr signed with USL Pro club Arizona United in March 2014.

References

1990 births
Living people
Haitian footballers
Haitian expatriate footballers
Maryland Terrapins men's soccer players
Phoenix Rising FC players
USL Championship players
Association football midfielders
Haitian expatriate sportspeople in the United States